Michael John Chamberlin (born June 7, 1937 in Chicago) is a Professor Emeritus of biochemistry and molecular biology at University of California, Berkeley. His research focused on the gene expression in both prokaryotes and eukaryotes. He studied how RNA polymerases initiated and terminated transcription. He became a member of the United States National Academy of Sciences in 1986. 

Chamberlin has trained leading molecular biologists who now hold positions throughout academia.  Some of his former Ph.D. students include Robert Kingston (Harvard), Karen Arndt (U. Pittsburgh), Alice Telesnitsky (U. Michigan), Tom Kerppola (U. Michigan), John Helmann (Cornell), David Arnosti (Michigan State), Leticia Márquez-Magaña (San Francisco State), and Tracy Johnson (UC San Diego).  In 2001, Chamberlin was recognized for his lifelong contribution to scientific research and training with the Sigma Xi Monie A. Ferst Award.

References

Living people
Members of the United States National Academy of Sciences
American biochemists
1937 births